Elm Branch is a stream in Pettis and Henry counties in the U.S. state of Missouri. It is a tributary of East Fork Tebo Creek.

Elm Branch was so named on account of elm timber in the area.

See also
List of rivers of Missouri
Tebo Creek

References

Rivers of Henry County, Missouri
Rivers of Pettis County, Missouri
Rivers of Missouri